Eisenacher Motorenwerk (EMW) was an East German manufacturer of automobiles and motorcycles based in Eisenach. EMW also entered Formula One as a constructor in 1953, but participated in only one race, the 1953 German Grand Prix. The car retired after 12 laps with exhaust problems.

Continuing BMW production

One of the pre-World War II BMW factories was located in Eisenach, which after the war was taken over by the Soviets, since Eisenach was situated in the Soviet occupation zone. The factory continued producing cars and motorcycles under the BMW brand, but after a lawsuit in 1952 they had to change the name to EMW instead. The logotype was also similar, but instead of the blue BMW used, EMW used red.

The Kasernierte Volkspolizei (a paramilitary police branch which preceded the National People's Army) and the succeeding East German armed forces needed vehicles and expressed interest in reviving production of the BMW 325, an unsuccessful wartime off-road Einheits-PKW (standardized passenger vehicle) built by BMW in Eisenach. This was developed into the new EMW 325/3, of which 166 were built in 1952. This remilitarization, however, was in violation of the terms of the Potsdam Conference and led to protests from the West.

New designs
Later the automobile section of EMW became VEB Automobilwerk Eisenach and built the Wartburg. Motorcycle manufacture ended in the 1950s and was replaced by the AWO 425 built by Simson at Suhl.

Complete Formula One World Championship results

(key)

* Constructors' Championship not awarded until .

References

Formula One constructors
Formula One entrants
BMW
German auto racing teams
German racecar constructors
Auto racing teams established in 1953
Auto racing teams disestablished in 1953
Defunct motor vehicle manufacturers of Germany
Motorenwerk
Transport in East Germany
Car manufacturers of East Germany
1945 establishments in Germany
1950s disestablishments in East Germany

de:Eisenacher Motorenwerk